Middlehaven is the oldest district in Middlesbrough, situated to the north of the current centre, North Yorkshire, England.

The area has had waves of regeneration since post-war devastation. The area currently includes from (west to east) a manufacturing and industrial sector, Boho Zone developments (residential and commerce), the Transporter Bridge, Middlesbrough College, docks and the Riverside Stadium. 

The term St Hilda's for the area relates to the former priory that was founded by Hilda of Whitby (the first mention of the town) and later also former church as named after the saint. The railway and A66 separating the area from the rest of the town created the term Over the Border for the area. The name Middlehaven is a back formation from Middlesbrough, combining "Middle" with "haven": the haven relates to Middlesbrough Dock.

History 

The area formed what was the original town centre of Middlesbrough after its foundation around 1830, and was originally known as St. Hilda's after the parish church of the same name. The district was eventually separated from the southward expansion of the town by the railway in 1846. The Old Town Hall was completed at that time.

By the 1930s, the area had become slums, with overcrowding and high crime, and demolitions begun despite protests from residents. Later, in the 1950s, the clearance continued with sweeping demolitions, and the replacement of the remaining homes by low-rise flat blocks.

Once again, beginning in 1969, there was another wave of demolition, this time replacing the 1950s flats with a suburban housing estate. In the regeneration, St. Hilda's church was demolished.

In 2004, the homes were mostly vacant and plans were announced to demolish the estate, relocating the remaining 300 residents. In the following years, the site was levelled as new developments began in the area, and the area became known as Middlehaven.

Middlesbrough Dock

The original dock for the 1830 Port Darlington development was too small by with in a decade of its use and needed expanding. From 1839–42 under William Cubitt and  George Turnbull plans, the dock was expanded and formally opened on the 12 May 1842. The dock was designed to have a  entrance channel from the River Tees to the 1:4.4 rectangular dock.

In 1994, a training ship called the "Tovarisch" was impounded at the dock for being unseaworthy for five years. The rotation of crew from the Kherson marine college played in a local five-a-side league during this time. The ship left on the 29 August 1999 for restoration in Wilhelmhaven, Germany, under funding from the Tall Ships Friends charity and the Ukrainian government.

 of goods went through the dock in 1978 while the wider ports in area (under the jurisdiction of Tees and Hartlepool Harbour Police) handled , the dock was unable to compete and in 1980 closed.

Gallery

See also
Boho, County Fermanagh
Bolckow, Vaughan
Middlesbrough Priory
Sheffield Old Town Hall

References 

Areas within Middlesbrough
Places in the Tees Valley